The Socialist Party (PS) is a social-democratic political party in Portugal. It was founded on 19 April 1973 in the German city of Bad Münstereifel by militants who were at the time with the Portuguese Socialist Action. The PS is a member of the Socialist International, Progressive Alliance and Party of European Socialists, and has nine members in the European Parliament within the Progressive Alliance of Socialists and Democrats group during the 9th European Parliament. It is the governing party of Portugal since the 2022 legislative election.

A party of the centre-left, the PS is one of the two major parties in Portuguese politics, its rival being the Social Democratic Party (PSD), a centre-right, conservative party. The current leader of the PS is António Costa, the current Prime Minister of Portugal. The party won 120 of 230 seats in the Portuguese parliament following the January 2022 election, enough to form a majority government.

History 

Inspired by May 68, the Socialist Party (PS) was created at a conference of Portuguese Socialist Action (ASP), at that time in exile, on 19 April 1973, in Bad Münstereifel in West Germany. The twenty-seven delegates decided to found a party of socialism and political freedom, making an explicit reference to a classless society and with Marxism as a source of principal inspiration.

On 25 April 1974, the Carnation Revolution brought down the authoritarian regime of the Estado Novo, established in 1933, and democracy was restored. Mário Soares, the party's General-Secretary, returned to Portugal after being in exile in France and became Minister of Foreign Affairs, and António de Almeida Santos was appointed Minister of Interjurisdictional Coordination in one of the first provisional governments. After the revolution, elections were called for 25 April 1975 and the PS won the 1975 election for the Constituent Assembly and the 1976 elections for the National Assembly, then losing to the Democratic Alliance (AD) in the 1979 legislative election. In 1980, the PS made an electoral alliance, called the Republican and Socialist Front (FRS), between the Independent Social Democrats (ASDI), led by Sousa Franco, and the Leftwing Union for the Socialist Democracy (UEDS), led by Lopes Cardoso. The alliance failed to defeat the AD.

They won the 1983 general election but without an absolute majority, and the PS formed a grand coalition with the centre-right Social Democratic Party (PSD), creating a Central Block. The new government began negotiations for Portugal to enter the European Economic Community (EEC). In 1985, the Central Block broke down and the PS, at the time led by Almeida Santos, lost the 1985 legislative election. Cavaco Silva's PSD won the 1985 elections, and again in 1987 and 1991 with an absolute majority. The PS was in opposition for more than ten years.

In the 1995 legislative election, the PS, then led by the already prominent António Guterres, won a general election for the first time in twelve years, and in the 1999 election failed to obtain what would have been a historic absolute majority for the party by only one MP. In 2001, after a massive defeat in the 2001 local elections, Guterres resigned as Prime Minister and called for new elections in 2002. The Socialist Party lost the 2002 general election by a small margin to the PSD, who formed a coalition government with the People's Party (CDS–PP). During this time, it has been argued that the Socialist Party moved towards the centre and adopted the Third Way.

In June 2004, the PS won the 2004 European elections by a landslide, and a few weeks later, Durão Barroso, leader of the PSD and Prime Minister, resigned to become President of the European Commission. In December 2004, Jorge Sampaio, President of the Republic, called fresh elections for February 2005. These elections resulted in a landslide victory for the PS, winning for the first time since its foundation an absolute majority. José Sócrates, leader of the PS, became Prime Minister of Portugal.

In 2009, after four-and-a-half years in power, the PS lost the 2009 European Parliament elections to the PSD. However, they won the general election held on 27 September 2009 but failed to renew the absolute majority they won in the previous general election. The PS later introduced and legislated same-sex marriage. The Eurozone crisis and financial crisis of 2011 hit Portugal very hard, prompting Sócrates' government to impose harsh austerity measures. On 23 March 2011, the entire opposition in Parliament said no to new measures proposed by the government. As a result of this, Sócrates resigned as Prime Minister and a snap election took place on 5 June 2011. In the elections, the PS suffered a huge setback, with 28.1% of the vote, ten points behind the PSD, who formed another coalition government with the CDS–PP. Sócrates resigned as General-Secretary on election night after the PS's worst result since 1987. On 23 July 2011, António José Seguro was elected as Sócrates' successor.

Under the leadership of Seguro, the PS won the 2013 local elections making significant gains over the PSD and the Socialists again won the European elections in May 2014 but this time only just. They won 31.5% of the vote against almost 28% of the alliance between the PSD and CDS–PP. The result was considered quite a disappointment to many PS members and supporters and on 27 May António Costa, the then-mayor of Lisbon announced that he would stand for the leadership of the PS. Seguro refused to call a new congress and leadership election and instead called for a primary election, to be held on 28 September, to elect the party's candidate for Prime Minister in the 2015 general elections. Costa, being endorsed by the left faction of the party and people like Mário Soares, Ana Catarina Mendes and Pedro Nuno Santos, easily defeated Seguro, who was supported by the more moderate and centrist wing of the party, by a 67% to 31% margin.

In the 2015 legislative elections, the PS polled a disappointing second place, capturing just 32% of the votes against the 38.6% of the PSD/CDS–PP electoral alliance Portugal Ahead. Despite the victory of the PSD/CDS-PP coalition, the centre-left and left-wing parties achieved a clear majority in the Portuguese parliament. After the second Passos Coelho cabinet fell in parliament, with the approval of a no-confidence motion, the PS forged a confidence and supply agreement with Left Bloc and Unitary Democratic Coalition to support a PS minority government. For the first time in Portuguese democracy, the leader of the second most voted political force became Prime Minister.

In order to avoid bankruptcy due to mounting debt, in 2017, the party, alongside the PSD, the Portuguese Communist Party, BE and the ecologist party PEV, voted in favour of abolishing party fundraising limits, thereby opening all portuguese parties to private political donorship, that they are not obligated to disclose. The new proposal was reluctantly approved by the Portuguese president Marcelo Rebelo de Sousa. 

Costa led a very successful first term as Prime Minister with a growing economy, low unemployment, and deficit cuts. Although he led a more left-leaning PS, Costa started to shift the party back to the centre in 2018, something that a younger and more left-wing faction, led by minister Pedro Nuno Santos, contested. In the 2019 European elections, the PS won a landslide by achieving 33.4%, against the 22% of the PSD. The PS also won the October 2019 general election with 36% of the votes, against the 28% of the PSD, but by a closer margin than expected. The Second Costa cabinet was sworn in on 26 October 2019.

In October 2020, the PS lost power in the Azores region after the Socialists lost their majority in the region's 2020 October elections. The PS only got 39% of the votes, a drop of 7 pp, and 25 seats. The rightwing parties, PSD, CDS, PPM, CHEGA, and IL won a majority of one seat over the whole leftwing, and a few weeks after the election, they forged a deal that led the PSD to government. As of 2021, the PS is now in opposition in the only two autonomous regions of the country.

For the 2021 Portuguese presidential election, Costa endorsed the incumbent Marcelo Rebelo de Sousa, something that made some party members unsatisfied. Former PS MEP Ana Gomes a critic of Costa and a member of the left faction of the party, ran for the presidency, declaring herself the candidate of democratic socialism and progressivism, stating that she has been disappointed with the leadership of the party for not having an official candidate. With the support of the left faction of the party and some more moderate members worried about corruption, Gomes finished in a disappointing second place behind de Sousa, who had many endorsements of party leaders like Lisbon's Mayor Fernando Medina, Eduardo Ferro Rodrigues, and Carlos César.

The party suffered a setback in the 2021 local elections by losing several cities to the PSD, but, the main defeat was the loss of Lisbon to the PSD candidate, who defeated Fernando Medina by a narrow 34% to 33% margin. After the local elections, tensions between the PS and its leftwing allies, BE and CDU, led to the rejection of the 2022 budget which forced the calling of a snap election for January 2022. Despite polls predicting a close race between the PS and PSD, the Socialists won a surprise absolute majority, only the 2nd in their history, with 41% of the votes against the 29% of the PSD.

Ideology 
The PS is a mainstream centre-left social democratic party with many internal factions, ranging from democratic socialism to social liberalism and centrism. It supports Keynesianism, Europeanism, and progressivism. Like many mainstream social democratic parties, it has previously adopted a Third Way outlook.

Election results

Assembly of the Republic
Seat share in the Portuguese legislative elections

European Parliament

Regional Assemblies

List of lead party figures

Secretaries-General 
Mário Soares: 19 April 1973 – 29 June 1986
António de Almeida Santos (ad interim): 13 June 1985 – 13 November 1985
António Macedo (ad interim): 13 November 1985 – 29 June 1986
Vítor Constâncio: 29 June 1986 – 14 January 1989
Jorge Sampaio: 14 January 1989 – 21 February 1992
António Guterres: 21 February 1992 – 19 January 2002
Eduardo Ferro Rodrigues: 19 January 2002 – 27 September 2004
José Sócrates: 27 September 2004 – 23 July 2011
António José Seguro: 23 July 2011 – 28 September 2014
Maria de Belém Roseira (ad interim): 28 September 2014 – 22 November 2014
António Costa: 22 November 2014 – present

Graphical timeline

Party presidents 

António Macedo: 19 April 1973 – 29 June 1986
Manuel Tito de Morais: 29 June 1986 – 14 January 1989
João Ferraz de Abreu: 14 January 1989 – 21 February 1992
António de Almeida Santos: 21 February 1992 – 9 September 2011
Maria de Belém Roseira: 9 September 2011 – 29 November 2014
Carlos César: 29 November 2014 – present

Presidents of the Assembly 
Henrique de Barros: 3 June 1975 – 2 April 1976
Vasco da Gama Fernandes: 29 July 1976 – 29 October 1978
Teófilo Carvalho dos Santos: 30 October 1978 – 7 January 1980
Manuel Tito de Morais: 8 June 1983 – 24 October 1984
António de Almeida Santos: 31 October 1995 – 4 April 2002
Jaime Gama: 16 March 2005 – 21 June 2011
Eduardo Ferro Rodrigues: 23 October 2015 – present

Prime Ministers 
Mário Soares: 23 July 1976 – 28 August 1978; 9 June 1983 – 6 November 1985
António Guterres: 28 October 1995 – 6 April 2002
José Sócrates: 12 March 2005 – 21 June 2011
António Costa: 26 November 2015 – present

Presidents of the Republic 
Mário Soares: 9 March 1986 – 9 March 1996
Jorge Sampaio: 9 March 1996 – 9 March 2006

See also 

Politics of Portugal
Socialist Party

Notes

References

External links 

 (list in Portuguese, links to international websites in English)
 (in Portuguese)
 Party of European Socialists
Socialist Internacional

 
1973 establishments in Portugal
Formerly banned socialist parties
Full member parties of the Socialist International
Organisations based in Lisbon
Party of European Socialists member parties
Political parties established in 1973
Political parties in Portugal
Pro-European political parties in Portugal
Progressive Alliance
Social democratic parties in Europe
Centre-left parties in Europe
Socialist parties in Portugal